Hypostatic, hypostasis, or hypostatization (hypostatisation; from the Ancient Greek , "under state") may refer to:

 Hypostasis (philosophy and religion), the essence or underlying reality
 Hypostatic abstraction (mathematics and logic)
 Hypostasis of the Archons, a Gnostic work
 Hypostasis (linguistics), personification of entities
 Hypostasis (literature), awareness by a fictional character that their world is fictional
 Hypostatic gene, as a result of epistasis
 Hypostasis (livor mortis), corpse's discoloration
 Hypostatic model of personality, a psychological model, or theory, of personality masks
 Hypostatic union, Christian concept
 Holding current (electronics), or the hypostatic current
 Reification (fallacy), where hypostasis identifies a reified thing, and hypostatization refers to the thought process
 Sediment in a liquid, including:
 Sediment#Dregs
 A type of boss enemy in the video game Genshin Impact

See also 
 Anthropomorphism (personification, hypostatization), regarding or treating something as having human qualities.